Kyetume is a township in Mukono District in the Central Region of Uganda.

Location
Kyetume is located within the town of Mukono (2014 population 161,996), the headquarters of and largest urban center in the district. The coordinates of Kyetume are 0°19'10.0"N, 32°46'10.0"E (Latitude:0.319444; Longitude:32.769444).

Points of interest

The following points of interest are located in Kyetume, or near its borders:

 Kyetume Railway Station 
 Kyetume Roman Catholic Church
 Kyetume SDA Church
 Kyetume Church of Uganda 
 Mukono–Kyetume–Katosi–Nyenga Road, passing through the middle of the township.

Gender Based Violence Prevention 
Kyetume has set up a community based health care service in order to combat issues such as Gender Based Violence Prevention.

In Uganda, Gender Based Violence is one of the leading causes of female injury and due to the larger number of men in power most women are seen as powerless.

To combat this the Kytume Community-based Health Care Service has started to raise awareness for such violence.

See also
List of cities and towns in Uganda
List of roads in Uganda

References

External links
Elevation Data For Kyetume

Mukono District
Populated places in Central Region, Uganda
Cities in the Great Rift Valley